Dai Yuqiang (March 12, 1963) is a Chinese operatic tenor. He was the first and only Chinese student of Luciano Pavarotti. With Wei Song and Warren Mok he has performed abroad as "China's Three Tenors."

Discography
 Opera arias, EMI
 Zuguo qing (Patriotic Emotion), 2010

References

1963 births
Living people
People from Langfang
Chinese operatic tenors
21st-century Chinese male opera singers
20th-century Chinese male opera singers